Lisa Ross (born 13 June 1977) is a Canadian sailor. She competed at the 2004 Summer Olympics and the 2008 Summer Olympics.

References

External links
 

1977 births
Living people
Canadian female sailors (sport)
Olympic sailors of Canada
Sailors at the 2004 Summer Olympics – Yngling
Sailors at the 2008 Summer Olympics – Laser Radial
People from Lunenburg County, Nova Scotia
Sportspeople from Nova Scotia